L-759,656 is an analgesic drug that is a cannabinoid agonist. It is a highly selective agonist for the CB2 receptor, with selectivity of 414x for CB2 over CB1, although it is still not as selective as newer agents such as HU-308.

It produces some similar effects to other cannabinoid agonists such as analgesia, but with little or no sedative or psychoactive effects due to its weak CB1 activity, and a relatively strong antiinflammatory effect due to its strong activity at CB2.

See also 
 Delta-11-Tetrahydrocannabinol
 L-759,633
 L-768,242

References 

Cannabinoids
Benzochromenes
Phenol ethers
Vinylidene compounds